Otego may refer to:

Places in the United States:
 Otego Township, Fayette County, Illinois
 Otego (village), New York in Otsego County
 Otego (town), New York in Otsego County
 Otego, Kansas

See also 
 Otego Creek
 List of The Dark Tower characters#Finli O'Tego
 Otago
 Otago Peninsula